In Canadian Constitutional law, interjurisdictional immunity is the legal doctrine that determines which legislation arising from one level of jurisdiction may be applicable to matters covered at another level. Interjurisdictional immunity is an exception to the pith and substance doctrine, as it stipulates that there is a core to each federal subject matter that cannot be reached by provincial laws. While a provincial law that imposes a tax on banks may be ruled intra vires, as it is not within the protected core of banking, a provincial law that limits the rights of creditors to enforce their debts would strike at such a core and be ruled inapplicable.

The paramountcy doctrine states that if two pieces of legislation meet, regulate the same activities, and conflict, the federal legislation is paramount, prevails and renders the provincial legislation inoperative. In contrast, the interjurisdictional immunity doctrine is activated even if there is no meeting of legislation or contradiction between federal and provincial statutes. It requires only for the provincial legislation to impact federal things, persons or undertakings significantly.  The doctrine renders inapplicable legislation of general application which affects the rights and obligations, impacts the status, or regulates the essential parts of:

 things,
 persons, or
 undertakings,

exclusively within the core of the jurisdiction of the other order of government.

Early cases

The doctrine was first formulated to deal with the effects that provincial laws could have on federally incorporated companies.

 In John Deere, provincial laws prohibiting companies not incorporated under the law of the enacting province from carrying on business without a prescribed licence were held not to apply to federally incorporated companies.
 In Great West Saddlery, an Ontario law prohibiting all companies from acquiring or holding land without a provincial license did not impair the status or essential powers of the federal companies that operated within the province.

Expansion of doctrine

Until 1966, undertakings which came within federal jurisdiction were held to be immune from otherwise valid provincial laws only if the laws had the effect of sterilizing, paralyzing or impairing the federally authorized activity. However, the scope of the doctrine was expanded in Bell Canada (1966), where a provincial law prescribing a minimum wage was held not to apply in 1966 when it was determined that a valid law could not apply, as such a law "affects a vital part of the management and operation of the undertaking". It did not matter that no sterilization, paralysis or impairment had occurred.

This doctrine was affirmed in 1988 when the Supreme Court of Canada ruled in three cases that provincial occupational health and safety laws were held to be inapplicable to three federal undertakings engaged in interprovincial transportation and communication. In Bell Canada v Quebec (1988), Beetz J declared:

The doctrine was modified in Irwin Toy to specify that:

 the "affecting a vital part" test only applied to provincial laws that were intended to apply directly to a federal undertaking, but
 where a provincial law had only an indirect effect, it would not be inapplicable unless it impaired a vital part of that undertaking.

Current jurisprudence

In response to this more classical approach to settling matters of constitutional law, the necessary degree of infringement was revisited in Canadian Western Bank in 2007, where the Supreme Court of Canada ruled that, in the absence of outright impairment of the "vital or essential part", interjurisdictional immunity would not apply. This was subsequently affirmed in Lafarge.

Therefore, in order to render statutes inapplicable, the impacts that engage the interjurisdictional immunity doctrine must be significant. The requirement is that legislation significantly embrace things, undertakings or persons exclusively in the jurisdiction of the other order of government. The interjurisdictional immunity doctrine will not render inapplicable insignificant impacts caused by legislation of general application.

Additionally, though the doctrine was textually justified in Canadian Western Bank, the court also expressed a preference for relying on the doctrine of federal paramountcy over interjurisdictional immunity when attempting to resolve federalism disputes (after the impugned legislation had been found valid):

While most jurisprudence has revolved around the applicability of provincial laws on undertakings under federal jurisdiction, one must not ignore its relevance with respect to things and persons. For example:

 in the matter of Canadian maritime law, provincial laws relating to damages, negligence and apportionment have been held not to apply to fill in any gaps that may exist, as maritime law is at the core of the federal power over "Navigation and Shipping".
 certain provincial laws regulating hunting have been held not to apply to Indians where they significantly interfere with treaty rights, as such rights have been held to be at the core of the federal power over "Indians and Indian lands".

In Quebec (Attorney General) v. Canadian Owners and Pilots Association ("COPA"), McLachlin CJ outlined a two-step test that must be undertaken to determine if interjurisdictional immunity comes into play:

Does the provincial law trench on the protected "core" of a federal competence?
Is the provincial law's effect on the exercise of the protected federal power sufficiently serious to invoke the doctrine of interjurisdictional immunity?

Though there remains some debate, it has generally been accepted that the doctrine applies to both the federal and provincial governments equally. Nevertheless, virtually all of the case law concerns situations where provincial laws encroach on federal matters. The Supreme Court has expressed caution in employing the doctrine in future cases because:

It is in tension with the dominant approach that permits concurrent federal and provincial legislation with respect to a matter.
It is in tension with the emergent practice of cooperative federalism.
It may overshoot the federal or provincial power in which it is grounded and create legislative "no go" zones where neither level of government regulates.

As McLachlin CJ explained in Canada (AG) v PHS Community Services Society:

See also

 Intergovernmental immunity - US doctrine
 Intergovernmental immunity - Australian doctrine

References

Further reading

 
 
 
 
 

Constitution of Canada
Federalism in Canada